Cruncheroos is a whole grain oat breakfast cereal manufactured by Kellogg's, originally available in Canada in two flavors, apple and cinnamon or honey and almonds. As the name states, the cereal was crunchy and O-shaped.

The cereal was created in the early 1990s and featured a mascot named "Crunchosaurus Rex", an anthropomorphic purple dinosaur who, in television advertisements, used stealth and cunning to steal the cereal from another character who was consuming it, such as a hungry museum guard working late at night.

Kellogg's discontinued the cereal from the retail market by the late 1990s, possibly due to its similarity to Apple Jacks, Apple Cinnamon Cheerios and Honey Nut Cheerios, which were already popular. However, a plain version, much less sweet than the original, is still marketed to the food service industry, without the Crunchosaurus Rex mascot.

References

Kellogg's cereals
Almond dishes